Engelbert Dollfuß (alternatively: Dolfuss, ; 4 October 1892 – 25 July 1934) was an Austrian Fatherland Front politician who served as Chancellor of Austria between 1932 and 1934. Having served as Minister for Forests and Agriculture, he ascended to Federal Chancellor in 1932 in the midst of a crisis for the conservative government. In early 1933, the so called "Selbstausschaltung des Parlaments" happened, which made the Austrian parliament unable to govern. Suppressing the Socialist movement in February 1934 during the Austrian Civil War and later banning the Austrian Nazi Party, he cemented the rule of authoritarian conservatism through the First of May Constitution. Dollfuss was assassinated as part of a failed coup attempt by Nazi agents in 1934. His successor Kurt Schuschnigg maintained the regime until Adolf Hitler's Anschluss in 1938.

Early life 

Dollfuss was born to a poor, peasant family in the hamlet of Great Maierhof in the commune of St. Gotthard near Texingtal in Lower Austria. Young Dollfuss spent his childhood in his step-father's house in the nearby commune of Kirnberg, where he also went to elementary school. The local parish priests helped to finance Dollfuss' education, as his parents were unable to do so by themselves alone. He attended high school in Hollabrunn. After graduating from high school, Dollfuss intended to become a priest, and thus he enrolled at the University of Vienna to study theology, but after a few months changed course and started studying law in 1912. As a student, he earned a livelihood giving lessons. He became a member of the Students' Social Movement, a student organisation dedicated to social and charitable work among the workers.

As World War I broke out, Dollfuss reported to be recruited in Vienna but was rejected because he was two centimetres shorter than the minimum. The same day he was rejected in Vienna, Dolfuss went to St. Pölten where the recruiting commission for his district was located and insisted to be recruited, and, even though he did not meet the minimum height standards, he was accepted. As a volunteer, he had a right to choose a regiment in which he would serve, and Dollfuss opted for the Tyrolese militia also known as the Kaiserschützen. He was soon promoted to the rank of corporal. He served for 37 months at the Italian Front, south of Tyrol. By 1916 he was promoted to lieutenant.

After the war, he was still a student and was employed by the Lower Austrian Peasants' Union, which helped him to secure his material existence, and it was here where Dollfuss gained his first political experience. There, he organised peasants to help them recover from the war, as well as shield them from the influences of Marxism. Being recognised for his abilities he showed at the Union, he was sent for further studies to Berlin. In Berlin, he began to garner dislike for some of his professors, as academia there was substantially influenced by liberalism and socialism. In his studies, he devoted himself to the Christian principles of economics. In Germany, he became a member of the Federation of German Peasants' Union and of the Preussenkasse – essentially, a central bank for member-cooperatives, where he gained practical experience. In Germany, he met his future wife Alwine Glienke, a descendant of a Pomeranian family. Dollfuss often met with Carl Sonnenschein, leader of social activities of students and the pioneer of the Catholic movement in Berlin.

After returning to Vienna, he was a secretary of the Lower Austrian Peasants' Union. He devoted his efforts to consolidate that industry. Dollfuss was instrumental in the founding of the regional Chamber of Agriculture of Lower Austria, becoming its secretary and a director; the Federation of Agriculture and the Agricultural Labourers’ Insurance Institute; in organising the new Agrarian policy of Lower Austria and in laying the foundations for the corporative organisation of agriculture. A few years later, he was representative of Austria at the International Agrarian Congress, where his proposals made him internationally known in that sphere. He was seen as an unofficial leader of the Austrian peasantry.

On 1 October 1930 Dollfuss was appointed the president of the Federal Railways, the largest industrial corporation in Austria. There, Dollfuss came into contact with all branches of the industry. In March 1931, he was appointed Federal Minister of Agriculture and Forestry.

Chancellor of Austria 

On 10 May 1932, Dollfuss, age 39 and with only one year's experience in the Federal Government, was offered the office of Chancellor by President Wilhelm Miklas, also a member of the Christian-Social Party. Dollfuss refused to reply, instead spending the night in his favourite church praying, returning in the morning for a bath and a spartan meal before replying to the President he would accept the offer. Dollfuss was sworn in on 20 May 1932 as head of a coalition government between the Christian-Social Party, the Landbund — a right-wing agrarian party — and Heimatblock, the parliamentary wing of the Heimwehr, a paramilitary ultra-nationalist group. The coalition assumed the pressing task of tackling the problems of the Great Depression. Much of the Austro-Hungarian Empire's industry had been situated in the areas that became part of Czechoslovakia and Yugoslavia after World War I as a result of the Treaty of Saint-Germain. Postwar Austria was therefore economically disadvantaged.

Dollfuss' majority in Parliament was marginal; his government had only a one-vote majority.

Dollfuss as dictator of Austria

Ascent to power 

In March 1933, a constitutional impasse arose over irregularities in the voting procedure in the Austrian parliament. The  Social Democratic president of the  National Council (the lower house of parliament), Karl Renner, resigned to be able to cast a vote as a parliament member. As a consequence, the two vice presidents, belonging to other parties, resigned as well in order to be able to vote. Without a president, the parliament could not conclude the session. Dollfuss took the three resignations as a pretext to declare that the National Council had become unworkable, and advised  President Wilhelm Miklas to issue a decree adjourning it indefinitely. When the National Council wanted to reconvene days after the resignation of the three presidents, Dollfuss had police bar entrance to parliament, effectively eliminating democracy in Austria. From that point onwards, he governed as dictator by emergency decree with absolute power.

Dollfuss was concerned that with  German National Socialist leader Adolf Hitler as Chancellor of Germany from January 1933, the Austrian National Socialists (DNSAP) could gain a significant minority in future elections (according to fascism scholar Stanley G. Payne, should elections have been held in 1933, the DNSAP could have mustered about 25% of the votes – contemporary Time magazine analysts suggest a higher support of 50%, with a 75% approval rate in the Tyrol region bordering Nazi Germany). In addition, the Soviet Union's influence in Europe had increased throughout the 1920s and early 1930s. Dollfuss banned the Communist Party of Austria on 26 May 1933 and the DNSAP on 19 June 1933. Under the banner of  Christian Social Party, he later established a one-party dictatorship rule largely modeled after fascism in Italy, banning all other Austrian parties - including the  Social Democratic Labour Party (SDAPÖ). Social Democrats however continued to exist as an independent organization, nevertheless, though without its paramilitary Republikanischer Schutzbund, which until banned on 31 March 1933 could have mustered tens of thousands against Dollfuss' government.

Austrofascism 

Dollfuss modelled Austrofascism according to Catholic corporatist ideals with  anti-secularist tones and in a similar way to Italian fascism, dropping Austrian pretenses of unification with Germany as long as the Nazi Party remained in power there. In August 1933, Benito Mussolini's regime issued a guarantee of Austrian independence. Dollfuss also exchanged "Secret Letters" with Mussolini about ways to guarantee Austrian independence. Mussolini had an interest in Austria forming a buffer zone against Nazi Germany. Dollfuss always stressed the similarity of the régimes of Hitler in Germany and Joseph Stalin in the Soviet Union, and was convinced that Austrofascism and Italian fascism could counter totalitarian national-socialism and communism in Europe.

In September 1933 Dollfuss merged his Christian Social Party with elements of other nationalist and conservative groups, including the Heimwehr (which encompassed many workers who were unhappy with the radical leadership of the socialist party) to form the  Vaterländische Front, though the Heimwehr continued to exist as an independent organization until 1936, when Dollfuss' successor Kurt von Schuschnigg forcibly merged it into the Front, instead creating the unabidingly loyal Frontmiliz as a paramilitary task-force. Dollfuss survived an assassination attempt in October 1933 by Rudolf Dertill, a 22-year-old who had been ejected from the military for his national-socialist views.

Austrian Civil War 

In February 1934 the security forces provoked arrests of Social Democrats and searches for weapons of the Social Democrats' already outlawed Republikanischer Schutzbund. After the Dollfuss dictatorship took steps against known Social Democrats, the Social Democrats called for nationwide resistance against the government. A civil war began, which lasted sixteen days, from 12 until 27 February. Fierce fighting took place primarily in the east of Austria, especially in the streets of some outer Vienna districts, where large fortress-like municipal workers' buildings were situated, and in the northern, industrial areas of the province of Styria, where Nazi agents had great interest in a bloodbath between security forces and workers' militias. The resistance was suppressed by police and military power. The Social Democrats were outlawed by the Federal government on 12 February 1934, and their leaders were imprisoned or fled abroad.

New constitution 

Dollfuss staged a parliamentary session with just his party members present in April 1934 to  have his new constitution approved, effectively the second constitution in the world espousing corporatist ideas (after that of the Portuguese Estado Novo). The session retrospectively made all the decrees already passed since March 1933 legal. The new constitution became effective on 1 May 1934 and swept away the last remnants of democracy and the system of the First Austrian Republic.

Assassination 

Dollfuss was assassinated on 25 July 1934 by ten Austrian Nazis (Franz Leeb, Josef Hackel, Ludwig Meitzen, and Erich Wohlrab, who were subsequently convicted and then hanged on 13 August, plus Paul Hudl, Franz Holzweber, Otto Planetta, and three others) of Regiment 89 who entered the Chancellery building and shot him in an attempted coup d'état. In his dying moments he asked for Viaticum, the Eucharist administered to a person who is dying, but his assassins refused to give it to him. Mussolini had no hesitation in attributing the attack to the German dictator: the news reached him at Cesena, where he was examining the plans for a psychiatric hospital. Mussolini personally gave the announcement to Dollfuss's widow, who was a guest at his villa in Riccione with her children. He also put at the disposal of Ernst Rüdiger Starhemberg, who spent a holiday in Venice, a plane that allowed the prince to rush back to Vienna and to face the assailants with his militia, with the permission of President Wilhelm Miklas.

Mussolini also mobilised a part of the Italian army on the Austrian border and threatened Hitler with war in the event of a German invasion of Austria to thwart the putsch. Then he announced to the world: "The independence of Austria, for which he has fallen, is a principle that has been defended and will be defended by Italy even more strenuously", and then replaced in the main square of Bolzano the statue of Walther von der Vogelweide, a Germanic troubadour, with that of Drusus, a Roman general who conquered part of Germany. This was the greatest moment of friction between Italian Fascism and National Socialism and Mussolini himself came down several times to reaffirm the differences in the field.

The assassination of Dollfuss was accompanied by uprisings in many regions in Austria, resulting in further deaths. In Carinthia, a large contingent of northern German Nazis tried to seize power but were subdued by the Italian units nearby. At first Hitler was jubilant, but the Italian reaction surprised him. Hitler became convinced that he could not face a conflict with the Western European powers, and he officially denied liability, stating his regret for the murder of the Austrian Chancellor. He replaced the ambassador to Vienna with Franz von Papen and prevented the conspirators entering Germany, also expelling them from the Austrian Nazi Party. The Nazi assassins in Vienna, after declaring the formation of a new government under Austrian Nazi Anton Rintelen, previously exiled by Dollfuss as Austrian Ambassador to Rome, surrendered after threats from the Austrian military of blowing up the Chancellery using dynamite, and were subsequently tried and executed by hanging. Kurt Schuschnigg, previously Minister of Education, was appointed new chancellor of Austria after a few days, assuming the office from Dollfuss’ deputy Starhemberg.

Out of a population of 6.5 million, approximately 500,000 Austrians were present at Dollfuss’ burial in Vienna. He is interred in the Hietzing cemetery in Vienna beside his wife Alwine Dollfuss (who died in 1973) and two of his children, Hannerl (died 1928) and Eva who were in Italy as guests of Rachele Mussolini at the time of his death, an event which saw Mussolini himself shed tears over his slain ally.

In literature 

In Bertolt Brecht's 1941 play The Resistible Rise of Arturo Ui, Dollfuss is represented by the character "Dullfeet".

Works 

 Das Kammersystem in der Landwirtschaft Österreichs. Agrarverlag, Wien 1929.
 Mertha, Rudolf, Dollfuß, Engelbert: Die Sozialversicherung in der Landwirtschaft Österreichs nach dem Stande von Ende März 1929. Agrarverlag, Wien 1929.
 Der Führer Bundeskanzler Dr. Dollfuß zum Feste des Wiederaufbaues. 3 Reden. 1. Mai 1934. Österr. Bundespressedienst, Wien 1934.
 Tautscher, Anton (Hrsg.): So sprach der Kanzler. Dollfuss’ Vermächtnis. Aus seinen Reden. Baumgartner, Wien 1935.
 Weber, Edmund (Hrsg.): Dollfuß an Oesterreich. Eines Mannes Wort und Ziel. Reinhold, Wien 1935.
 Maderthaner, Wolfgang (Hrsg.): „Der Führer bin ich selbst.“ Engelbert Dollfuß – Benito Mussolini. Briefwechsel. Löcker, Wien 2004, .

Footnotes

References

Books 

 

 
 

1892 births
1934 deaths
20th-century Chancellors of Austria
Austrian Ministers of Defence
People from Melk District
Austrian anti-communists
Antisemitism in Austria
Anti-Masonry
Chancellors of Austria
Foreign ministers of Austria
Austrofascists
Austrian Civil War
Christian fascists
Austro-Hungarian military personnel of World War I
World War I prisoners of war held by Italy
Assassinated Austrian politicians
Deaths by firearm in Austria
Austrian Roman Catholics
Christian Social Party (Austria) politicians
Austro-Hungarian Army officers
People murdered in Austria
Assassinated heads of government
Male murder victims
1934 murders in Austria
Fatherland Front politicians
Austro-Hungarian prisoners of war in World War I
Conservatism in Austria